There were two Dissolution Honours in 1974, due to there being two general elections held in the United Kingdom that year:

February 1974 Dissolution Honours
October 1974 Dissolution Honours